National Route 1 (officially PY01, in Spanish, Ruta Nacional Número 1, or simply Ruta Uno) is one of the most important and one of the first highways in Paraguay, which runs from the capital city, Asunción to Itapua Department's capital, Encarnación. Crossing the departments of Central, Paraguarí, Misiones and Itapua. It starts on the intersection of Choferes del Chaco and Fernando de la Mora Avenues, known as Cuatro Mojones, and ends at the San Roque González de Santa Cruz Bridge, on the Paraná River, traversing .

Distances and important cities

The following table shows the distances traversed by PY01 in each different department, and important cities that it passes by (or near).

1